Tephrosia onobrychoides, commonly called multi-bloom hoary pea, is a species of plant in the pea family that is native to Texas, Louisiana, Arkansas, Oklahoma, Mississippi, and Alabama in the United States of America.

References

onobrychoides
Flora of Alabama
Flora of Arkansas
Flora of Louisiana
Flora of Mississippi
Flora of Oklahoma
Flora of Texas